The big-eared brown bat (Histiotus macrotus) is a species of vesper bat found in Argentina, Paraguay, and Chile.

Taxonomy
It was described as a new species in 1835 by German zoologist Eduard Friedrich Poeppig. Poeppig placed it in the genus Nycticeius, with a binomial of N. macrotus. By 1875, it was published under its current name combination, Histiotus macrotus.

Description
It has large ears that exceed  in length. The fur on its back is dark brown, while its belly fur is whitish. The flight membranes and ears are the darkest parts of its body.

Range and habitat
It is found in South America, where its range includes Argentina, Chile, and Paraguay. One study published that the species was found in Peru, though the image of the specimen did not appear to show the big-eared brown bat.

Conservation
As of 2016, it is evaluated as a least-concern species by the IUCN.

References

Histiotus
Mammals described in 1835
Mammals of Argentina
Mammals of Chile
Bats of South America
Taxonomy articles created by Polbot
Mammals of Paraguay
Taxa named by Eduard Friedrich Poeppig